Shek Pik Reservoir is a reservoir in Shek Pik on Lantau Island in Hong Kong. Built between 1957 and 1963, it has a storage capacity of 24 million cubic metres and is the third largest reservoir in Hong Kong after High Island Reservoir and Plover Cove Reservoir.

Location
Shek Pik Reservoir is located within Lantau South Country Park. It is surrounded by the following areas: Kau Nga Ling (east), Keung Shan (west), Muk Yue Shan and Sz Tsz Tau Shan (north). The top of the main dam is part of Keung Shan Road which connects Tai O with Cheung Sha, Mui Wo and Tung Chung. Below the dam is Shek Pik Prison managed by the Hong Kong Correctional Services.

History
In the 1950s, water became short in Hong Kong. To relieve the problem the Hong Kong Government decided to build a reservoir in Shek Pik Heung valley and to further develop Lantau Island. The main contractor for the reservoir scheme was Soletanche, a French company.

Prior to construction there were four villages, Shek Pik Tai Tseun, Fan Pui Tsuen, Kong Pui Tsuen and Hang Tsai Tseun, in the valley. They were all relocated as part of the reservoir construction.

A Hau Wong Temple was located there and was inundated by the Shek Pik Reservoir in 1960.

In 1961, an 8 mile submarine pipeline was built to move water from the reservoir to Hong Kong Island, submerged from Silvermine Bay to Sandy Bay. Water supply started November 1963, however there was an internal lining failure.

See also
 Water supply and sanitation in Hong Kong

References

Further reading

External links

Reservoirs in Hong Kong
Shek Pik